The Toyota GR Yaris Rally2 is a Rally2 car built by Toyota Gazoo Racing WRT based on the GR Yaris production car. The car made its first public appearance at the 2022 Rally Japan, with Juha Kankkunen as the driver.

References

External links 
 

GR Yaris Rally2
Rally2 cars
All-wheel-drive vehicles